N.I.C.E. 2, known in North America as BreakNeck, is a video game developed by Synetic and published by Magic Bytes in Germany in 1998, and by SouthPeak Games in North America in 2000. It is the sequel to the racing game Have a N.I.C.E. day.

Reception

The game received favorable reviews according to the review aggregation website Metacritic. In his early review of the game, Doug Trueman of NextGen called it "A surprisingly well made and full-featured racer."

References

External links
 

1998 video games
Magic Bytes games
Multiplayer and single-player video games
Racing video games
SouthPeak Games
Video game sequels
Video games developed in Germany
Windows games
Windows-only games